Thomas Erwin Bender (27 September 1944 – 20 January 2014) was an Australian basketball player. He competed in the men's tournament at the 1972 Summer Olympics.

References

1944 births
2014 deaths
Australian men's basketball players
Olympic basketball players of Australia
Basketball players at the 1972 Summer Olympics
Basketball players from Iowa
Tulsa Golden Hurricane men's basketball players